Brawley Wash is an ephemeral stream, tributary to the Santa Cruz River, located in Pima County. It flows north-north east through the Altar Valley and turns north as it enters Avra Valley near Robles Junction (also known as Three Points) where Arizona State Route 86 crosses the streambed. The wash traverses the Avra Valley between the Roskruge Mountains and the Tucson Mountains. It joins the Santa Cruz east of the Samaniego Hills of the Silver Bell Mountains. The wash is known as the Los Robles Wash near its junction with the Santa Cruz approximately six miles west of Avra and Interstate 10.

The name is supported by the Geographic Names Information System.

References

Rivers of Pima County, Arizona
Santa Cruz River (Arizona)
Rivers of Arizona